The Lowcountry Rapid Transit system (LCRT) is a bus rapid transit system in development which will connect the city of Charleston to the town of Summerville. It is the first mass transit project in the history of South Carolina. Construction is slated to begin in 2023 and the system is expected to be in operation by 2026.

Plans 
The Berkeley-Charleston-Dorchester Council of Governments (BCDCOG) started the development of the mass transit system in 2014. Due to the area's geographic population spread, rail was considered impractical. The current plan is for a bus rapid transit system that will traverse 21.5 miles. Buses will have priority at intersections allowing them to bypass traffic. LCRT is expected to consist of 24 buses that will ferry people between the medical district in downtown Charleston and Summerville. Costs for LCRT are estimated to be $360 million. The system will use existing infrastructure from Charleston Area Regional Transportation Authority (CARTA). LCRT planners believe fares will be $2.

The system will start with 18 stops, a large portion of which are likely to be on Rivers Avenue in North Charleston. The exact locations for many of the stops have not been determined yet. In 2018, the Federal Transit Administration provided a $880,000 grant to aid in planning for development along the line. In 2021, the administration provided another $860,000 to BCDCOG for key development tools. A transit framework plan also determined other potential bus transit corridors in the area.

References 

Bus rapid transit in the United States
Transportation in South Carolina
Charleston, South Carolina
Charleston County, South Carolina
Berkeley County, South Carolina
Dorchester County, South Carolina